This article is about the phonology and phonetics of the Kyrgyz language.

Vowels

 Notes on vowel quality:
 Kyrgyz vowel space is different in affixes and stems.  describes the former as more typical and more condensed.
In affix vowel space, they can have the same backness, and differ by height.
  appears only in borrowings from Persian and is excluded from normal vowel harmony rules. There is also a phonetic  which appears as a result of regressive assimilation of  before syllables with phonological front vowels, e.g. 'sloping'.
  are sometimes transcribed .
 The sequence of any vowel and the consonant  is pronounced as a long vowel with falling pitch.
 In colloquial speech, word-final vowels are dropped when the next word begins with a vowel.
 All vowels but  may be both short and long. Long vowels are the result of historical elisions (e.g. compensatory lengthening) and contractions. For example, jaa "rain" < *yağ; bee "mare" (cf. Kazakh biye); too "mountain" < *tağ; döölöt "wealth" < Arabic daulat; uluu "great" < *uluğ; elüü "fifty" < *elliğ.

Consonants

  are alveolar, whereas  are dental.
 the liquid  is velarized  in back vowel contexts.
  are velar, whereas  is palatal.
  are palatal  in words with front vowels, and uvular  in words with back vowels.
 Word-initial  is often voiced .
 In loanwords from Persian and Arabic, palatal  are always followed by front vowels, whereas velar  are always followed by back vowels, regardless of the vowel harmony.
 Word-final and word-initial  is voiced to  when it is surrounded by vowels or the consonants .
  occur only in foreign borrowings.
 In colloquial speech:
  is lenited to  after  or between vowels.
  is deaffricated to  before voiceless consonants.

Stress

Recent loanwords often retain their original stress.

Desonorisation and devoicing

See Kyrgyz language#Case for more examples.

References

Bibliography

Further reading

 
 
 

Phonology
Turkic phonologies